Scheibe may refer to:

 Scheibe-Alsbach, a municipality in the Sonneberg district of Thuringia, Germany
 Scheibe Flugzeugbau, German manufacturer of sailplanes and motorgliders

People with the surname
 Emil P. Scheibe (1861–1910), American politician
 Herbert Scheibe (1914–1991), German colonel
 Jo-Michael Scheibe (born 1950), American conductor and music professor
 Johann Scheibe ( 1680–1748), German organ builder, see Paulinerkirche, Leipzig; father of Johann Adolf Scheibe
 Johann Adolf Scheibe (1708–1776), German composer, theorist, and critic
  (1891–1956), German painter
 Richard Scheibe (1879–1964), German sculptor
 Siegfried Scheibe (1916–1945), Sturmbannführer (Major) in the Waffen SS during World War II
 Susanne Scheibe, German figure skater, former partner of Andreas Nischwitz

See also
 Scheiber
 Scheiße (disambiguation)